Lammert van Raan (born 3 February 1962) is a Dutch politician currently serving as a member of the House of Representatives. Previously, he served as member of the water board of Amstel, Gooi and Vecht and the municipal council of Amsterdam. In 2015, Van Raan joined the States-Provincial of North Holland, where he served as member until his election to the House of Representatives in 2017.

Van Raan, born in a family of entrepreneurs, originally supported the People's Party for Freedom and Democracy, but after his wife, Lieke Keller, co-founded the Party for the Animals (PvdD), he got more involved with left-wing politics and eventually joined the PvdD. A key reason for this switch was global warming, saying: "We're messing up the Earth, but I stay optimistic."

Electoral history

References

External links 

1962 births
Living people
21st-century Dutch politicians
Members of the House of Representatives (Netherlands)
Members of the Provincial Council of North Holland
Municipal councillors of Amsterdam
Party for the Animals politicians
People from Harlingen, Netherlands